Luigi Cossa (May 27, 1831 – May 10, 1896), Italian economist, was born in Milan.

Life
Educated at the universities of Pavia, Vienna and Leipzig, he was appointed professor of political economy at Pavia in 1858.
Apart from this Cossa was the author of several other works which established him a high reputation.

Major works

Scienza delle Finanze (1875, English translation 1888: Taxation, its Principles and Methods)
Guida allo studio dell economia politica (1876, English translation 1880: Guide to the Study of Political Economy, with an introduction by Stanley Jevons), a compendium of the theoretical preliminaries of economics, with a brief critical history of the science and an extensive bibliography
Introduzione allo studio deli economia politica (1876, English translation by L Dyer, 1893: An Introduction to the Study of Political Economy)
Saggi di economia politica, 1878.

Notes

References

Sources
 M. Blaug (ed.) - Who's who in economics (3d edition), 1999.

External links
 

1831 births
1896 deaths
Italian economists
Historians of economic thought